Air Tahiti is a French airline company which operates in French Polynesia, France. Its main hub is Faa'a International Airport. It is the largest private employer in French Polynesia.

Company history

Early seaplane operations 
The company was founded in July 1950 by Jean Arbelot and Marcel Lasserre, operating between Papeete, Raiatea, and Bora Bora using a 7-seater seaplane, a Grumman Widgeon J-4F.

In 1951, the French Ministry for the Overseas purchased on behalf of the Territory a Grumman Mallard amphibian aircraft, which the airline was allowed to use. In May 1951 it inaugurated a fortnightly mail service between Papeete and Aitutaki in the Cook Islands, only for the first flight to be turned away due to concerns about Polio. The route was discontinued in June 1952 when TEAL extended its service to Papeete. The airline temporarily ceased all operations in July 1952 after a crash injured its only pilot, but services resumed in April 1953 after an Australian pilot was recruited. Gradually, Air Tahiti spread its wings to all the islands of French Polynesia. In 1953 the first landing in the Gambier archipelago was achieved. In October 1953, the first flight to the Marquesas islands took place with a sea-landing at Taiohae / Nuku Hiva.

RAI
In July 1953 the Territory reallocated the Grumman Mallard to Régie Aérienne Interinsulaire (RAI, "interisland aviation board"), a subsidiary of Transports Aériens Intercontinentaux, which took over air transport in French Polynesia. The Air Tahiti brand then disappeared. RAI acquired two Consolidated PBY Catalina seaplanes to expand links between the islands of French Polynesia. Originally operating in an orange livery, these aircraft later adopted green and blue. The network was expanded, and in 1955, the Austral archipelagos inaugurated seaplane service with the opening of routes to Tubuai and Raivavae.

In 1958 RAI rebranded as the Réseau Aérien Interinsulaire (Inter-Island Aviation Network). It continued to operate seaplanes, and expanded its network to include the Tuamotus. It also operated a Short Sandringham "Bermuda" flying boat connecting the main runway at Bora-Bora with Papeete. The construction of Papeete's Faa'a International Airport in 1960 was followed by a vast construction program of runways across French Polynesia, and RAI's fleet shifted away from seaplanes towards conventional aircraft.

Air Polynésie
In 1970, RAI rebranded again as Air Polynésie. Nicknamed "Air Po" by Polynesians, the company asserted more of its Polynesian identity and implemented regular services throughout French Polynesia and especially to the more remote islands.  The airline had a "virtual monopoly" due to a convention with the territorial government. Initially operating a Short Sandringham "Bermuda" flying boat, a Douglas DC-4 propliner and a de Havilland Canada DHC-6 Twin Otter turboprop, it later added a Britten-Norman BN-2 Islander and two Fokker F27 Friendships. It began operations to Huahine in April 1971. In late 1984, faced with a need for new capital to purchase modern aircraft, it threatened to wind itself up unless a loan was guaranteed by the territorial government.

Air Tahiti again
In 1985, the former UTA (by then absorbed by Air France) sold a majority of Air Polynesia shares, with 25% being given to the French Polynesian government and the remaining 45% sold to local investors. In 1987 the airline was again rebranded as Air Tahiti, using a fleet of ATR 42 regional turboprop aircraft. Between 1987 and 2007 it quadrupled its passenger-kilometres travelled, from 75 million to 315 million.

Destinations 
Air Tahiti covers a network of 47 islands in French Polynesia and Cook Islands.

Society Islands
Bora Bora
Huahine
Maupiti
Moorea
Raiatea
Tahiti (Hub)

Tuamotu Archipelago   
Ahe
Aratika
Arutua
Faaite
Fakarava
Katiu
Kauehi
Kaukura
Manihi
Mataiva
Niau
Rangiroa
Takapoto
Takaroa
Tikehau

East Tuamotu-Gambier archipelago  
Anaa
Fangatau
Hao
Hikueru
Mangareva /(Gambier)
Makemo
Napuka
Nukutavake
Pukarua
Raroia
Reao
Tatakoto
Tureia
Vahitahi
    
Marquesas archipelago  
Hiva Oa
Nuku Hiva
Ua Huka
Ua Pou

Austral archipelago  
Raivavae
Rimatara
Rurutu
Tubuai

Tuamotu archipelago
Apataki	
Fakahina	
Puka-Puka
Takume

International destinations

Cook Islands 
Rarotonga

Fleet 

As of September 2018, the Air Tahiti fleet consists of:

Accidents and incidents 
 On April 18, 1991, Air Tahiti Flight 805 was on approach to Nuku Hiva Airport, when the aircraft, a Dornier 228, suffered an engine failure and attempted to ditch near the coast. 10 of the 20 occupants in the aircraft were killed.

References

External links

Official Air Tahiti Website
 Aircraft manufacturer ATR website
 SEAC State Department of Civil Aviation Website

Airlines of France
Airlines of French Polynesia
Airlines established in 1953
1953 establishments in French Polynesia
Former seaplane operators